Simon Berrisford (born 29 December 1963) is a British rower.  He competed in the men's coxless four event at the 1988 Summer Olympics and in the men's coxed four at the 1992 Summer Olympics.  He won a silver medal at the 1989 World Rowing Championships in the coxless pairs, partnered by Steve Redgrave.

References

External links
 
 

1963 births
Living people
English male rowers
British male rowers
Olympic rowers of Great Britain
Rowers at the 1988 Summer Olympics
Rowers at the 1992 Summer Olympics
World Rowing Championships medalists for Great Britain